Here Comes Everybody is the second studio album by Australian indie rock band Spacey Jane, released on 24 June 2022 independently through AWAL. Written following the band's tour for Sunlight (2020) when the COVID-19 pandemic was disrupting the music industry, the record's lyricism is often reflective of anxieties during the time, and throughout the youth of frontman Caleb Harper, whose experiences with depression are a major lyrical focus. Produced mostly by Konstantin Kersting, the album marks a significant sonic departure from their debut. It peaked at number one on the ARIA Charts.

At the 2022 ARIA Music Awards, the album was nominated for Best Rock Album, and Australian Album of the Year at the J Awards. In the Triple J Hottest 100 of 2022, six of the album's tracks were featured in the countdown, with "Hardlight", "It's Been a Long Day" and "Sitting Up" placing at number three, five and six respectively.

Background
Following the release of their debut album Sunlight (2020), Spacey Jane signed to drummer and co-manager Kieran Lama's management company Anybody Management on 12 February 2021. On 16 June 2021, the band renewed their global record deal with AWAL, with marketing director Ben Godding stating that the label "firmly believe[d] they are now poised to break through on a global scale".

Writing and recording
On 8 June 2020, in an interview in promotion of Sunlight, frontman Caleb Harper revealed that they were already working on their next album, stating, "We were in the studio in June. We're looking to basically get another record under our belts, and be as ready as possible for touring whenever that happens." He detailed the pandemic's impact on the process, saying, "when we first cancelled everything, I had five weeks of literally nothing and did a lot of writing."

On 29 January 2021, following their cover of the Beatles' "Here Comes the Sun" on Triple J's Like a Version segment, Harper revealed in an accompanying interview that their second album was "almost completely" written. He continued, saying: "We've actually recorded a few tracks off it already, and we are about to start recording the rest of it." On 28 March, Harper revealed to Honi Soit that the band were finalising tracking on the album. On 9 August, the band confirmed they had "very recently" finished recording the album, sharing a photo on social media of Harper and Hardman-Le Cornu alongside producer Konstantin Kersting outside Empire Studios in Brisbane, Queensland, revealing the latter had partially produced the record.

Composition

Influences 
On 21 January 2021, Harper revealed that "the lack of touring could influence [the band's] new material". When interviewed for Honi Soit, the band revealed that they would be listening to the albums Stranger in the Alps and Punisher by Phoebe Bridgers, and Graceland by Paul Simon during their forthcoming tour. Harper felt that their future live performances would be "less of a rock show", instead being "the songs for what they are."

The title of the album, Here Comes Everybody, is taken from the working title of Wilco's Yankee Hotel Foxtrot – a band frontman Caleb Harper claims is one of their biggest influences. Harper personally sought permission from the earlier band to use the name.

Lyricism and production 
Harper explained "Lots of Nothing" is written about "trying to accept all the parts of yourself, good and bad, before you are able to work on the person that you want to become". He admitted in an interview with Apple Music that depression as a lyrical theme runs throughout "half of the album", particularly in tracks like "Clean My Car" and "Haircut" – the latter using personal anecdote to explain things the frontman did to "reinvent myself and pull myself out of a state of mind after a breakup". Similarly, "It's Been a Long Day", one of the record's most sonically desolate tracks, follows Harper's emotions falling in and out of a relationship and battles with depersonalisation. The song closes with Harper's admission that "I really loved you". 

"Lunchtime" was written as Harper was experiencing "severe hangover anxiety and feeling extremely hopeless", with the track's fast and upbeat instrumentation directly contradicting the "somber lyrics and themes". "Head Above" concerns Harper's broken relationship with his parents, and leaving home at 17. Closing tracks "Yet" and "Pulling Through" are relatively "hopeful", with Harper saying that "after all these stories and experiences I've had, it's gonna be OK".

Release
Lead single "Lots of Nothing" was first performed at the Fremantle Arts Centre during the band's Sunlight Tour. It was officially released on 24 June 2021, whereupon Harper revealed that the band weren't expecting to release the album until at least 2022. Second single "Lunchtime" was issued on 7 October 2021 alongside a music video and confirmation of the band's intention to release the album in the first half of 2022. In November, the band appeared on ABC's The Sound to perform the track live from Red Hill Auditorium, Western Australia.

On 7 January 2022, Simon Collins of the West Australian listed the album as one of his most anticipated albums of that year. On 10 February, third single "Sitting Up" was issued, with Harper announcing on Triple J's breakfast program Bryce & Ebony that the album was titled Here Comes Everybody and that it would be released on 10 June 2022. However, this date was pushed back to 24 June due to vinyl production days. "It's Been a Long Day" (February) and "Hardlight" (April) followed as fourth and fifth singles. Dates for an Australian tour were also issued for August 2022. Sixth and final single "Pulling Through" was released on 20 June 2022, as the closing track of the record. The band embarked on a national record store tour for the week directly following the album's release on 24 June 2022.

On 1 July 2022, Here Comes Everybody peaked at number 1 on the ARIA Albums and Australian Albums Charts. At the 2022 ARIA Music Awards, the album was nominated for Best Rock Album, and Australian Album of the Year at the J Awards.

On 10 February 2023, the band released a deluxe version of the album, featuring two unreleased studio tracks, a live performance of "Hardlight" and a previously-released remix of "Lots of Nothing" featuring New Zealand artist Benee.

Tour 
Spacey Jane embarked on the Here Comes Everybody Tour from 2022 to 2023. It was the band's first time touring in North America, with its leg being postponed numerous times due to visa complications and travel restrictions with the COVID-19 pandemic.

Critical reception 

Reviewing the album for NME, Caleb Triscari praised the album for offering "promising development from Spacey Jane", commenting on Harper's fuller use of his vocal range and new instrumentation. On the melancholic lyrics in tracks like "Not What You Paid For" and "It's Been A Long Day", Triscari wrote "two-thirds through the album, we’re left begging, pleading for a reprieve". Vivienne Kelly of Rolling Stone Australia concluded the record is a "relaxed and resilient ride through the minutiae of everyday life".

Shaad D'Souza for the Guardian was more critical, describing the album as "painfully sophomoric indie rock". He criticised the repetitive themes of heartbreak and disaffection, writing "most of the songs here hit the same beats over and over", and how "musically, it sounds like so many other records released by Australian indie bands in the past decade".

Track listing
All tracks written by Ashton Hardman-Le Cornu, Caleb Harper, Kieran Lama, and Peppa Lane; track 13 co-written by Benee.

Personnel
Spacey Jane
 Caleb Harper – vocals, guitar, writing
 Ashton Hardman-Le Cornu – lead guitar, backing vocals, writing
 Kieran Lama – drums, writing
 Peppa Lane – bass guitar, backing vocals, writing

Additional personnel

 Benee – writing, vocals 
 Dave Parkin – producer , mixing , engineer 
 Konstantin Kersting – producer , engineer 
 Rich Costey – mixing 
 Jeff Citron – mix assistant
 Brian Lucey – mastering
 Matt Sav – photography
 Gesture Systems – design

Charts

Weekly charts

Year-end charts

Release history

References

2022 albums
Spacey Jane albums
Albums produced by Dave Parkin
Albums produced by Konstantin Kersting
AWAL albums